Irena Maria Lichnerowicz-Augustyn (born 16 May 1974, Brodnica) is a Polish diplomat who serves an ambassador of Poland to Cyprus since 5 September 2018.

Life 
Irena Lichnerowicz-Augustyn has graduated from the English studies at the Nicolaus Copernicus University in Toruń. She also studied at the Université d’Angers (Lettres et Sciences Humaines) and did her MA at University of Bath from European Studies-Euromasters programme.

In 1999 she started her career at the Chancellery of the President of the Republic of Poland, initially as an expert in the Foreign Affairs Office and then senior expert in the Presidential Protocol Division. In 2005 she began her diplomatic career at the Ministry of Foreign Affairs. Since December 2014 until 2018 she was the director of Protocol Division. She was responsible for organizing and coordinating such events as NATO Summit in Warsaw in 2016 and World Youth Days in 2016. On 5 September she became ambassador to Cyprus. She presented her credentials on 14 November 2018.

Beside Polish, she can speak English, French, Italian, and to some extent, German and Russian languages. She is married, with one daughter.

Honours 

 Silver Cross of Merit (Poland, 2012)
 Officer's Cross of the Order of Leopold II (Belgium, 2004)
 Cross of Merit with Ribbon of the Order of Merit (Germany, 2005)
 Commander of the Order of the Lion of Finland (Finland, 2015)
 Grand Officer of the Order of the Crown (Belgium 2015)
 Commander of the Order of Merit of the Republic of Italy (Italy, 2014)
 Commander's Cross of the Royal Norwegian Order of Merit (Norway, 2016)
 Grand Commander of the Order of Makarios III (Cyprus, 2021)

References 

1974 births
Alumni of the University of Bath
Ambassadors of Poland to Cyprus
Commanders of the Order of the Lion of Finland
Commanders of the Order of Merit of the Italian Republic
Living people
Nicolaus Copernicus University in Toruń alumni
Officers of the Order of Leopold II
People from Brodnica County
Recipients of the Order of Merit of the Federal Republic of Germany
Recipients of the Silver Cross of Merit (Poland)
Polish women ambassadors